Práxedis G. Guerrero is one of the 67 municipalities of Chihuahua, in northern Mexico. The municipal seat lies at Práxedis G. Guerrero, Chihuahua. The municipality covers an area of 808.97 km² and stands on the US border close to Ciudad Juárez.

Name
The municipality's name was given to it by the State Congress in December 1933, to honor the Revolutionary leader Práxedis G. Guerrero, who was killed in action in Janos, Chihuahua, on 30 December 1910. It was previously known as San Ignacio.

History

Demographics

As of 2010, the municipality had a total population of 4,799, dramatically down from 8,514 as of 2005.

As of 2010, the town of Práxedis G. Guerrero had a population of 2,128. Other than the town of Práxedis G. Guerrero, the municipality had 85 localities, the largest of which (with 2010 population in parentheses) was: El Porvenir (1,253), classified as rural.

Práxedis G. Guerrero has a very low population that rarely grows. In fact, much of the population, above all those of school age, leave for nearby Ciudad Juárez, due to the higher level of economic activity there.

Geography

Towns and villages
The municipality has 27 localities. The largest are:

Adjacent municipalities and counties
 Guadalupe Municipality - east, south, and west
 Hudspeth County, Texas - north and northeast

Climate and ecology
The climate is extremely arid, with very high temperatures in the summer and very low temperatures in the winter, with extreme recorded temperatures of 43°C and -23°C. It has very low levels of precipitation.

Its flora are plants typical of the desert, and its fauna includes species such as the puma and the coyote.

Politics

Municipal presidents
1998–2001: Diego Javier Cedillos Aguirre
2001–2004: Rafael Carreón González
2004–2007: Juvenal Rodela Campos

In 2010 20-year-old Marisol Valles García, a criminology student, became the municipality's main chief of police. As of that year the police department consisted of 13 members, mostly women, who are unarmed.

References

Municipalities of Chihuahua (state)
Chihuahua (state) populated places on the Rio Grande